Dol Theeta is a progressive metal band formed in 2008 by Greek music composer Thanasis Lightbridge. The band represents the second project of Lightbridge's "Electronica Art Metal" vision, the first project being Dol Ammad a more powerful and epic progressive project. Dol Theeta has a more atmospheric and psychedelic character and combines diverse musical styles such as heavy metal, electronica and opera.  In 2022, the album "Monad" was released by Dol Theeta.  The album is described as Thanasis Lightbridge's "mid-life autobiography and the result of extreme introspection" and "the general concept of the album revolves around the potential power of the unit. The power of one."

Lineup

Members
 Thanasis Lightbridge - Synthesizers, drums, vocals
 Kortessa Tsifodimou - Vocals
 Dim - Electric guitar

Sound engineer
 Argy Stream

Discography
"Goddess" (single, 2008)
The Universe Expands (full-length, 2008)
Monad (full-length, 2022)

References

External links
 
 Thanasis Lightbridge youtube channel

Musical groups established in 2008
Greek heavy metal musical groups
Greek musical trios